George F. Bowles (1844 - December 26, 1899) was a lawyer, militia colonel, chief of police and state legislator in Mississippi.

Early life, civil war and education 
He was born 1844 in Charleston, South Carolina, as a slave. He became free before the American Civil War and was educated in South Carolina, Kentucky and Tennessee.

He enlisted in 1863 and served in the Union Army in the American Civil War. After the war ended he studied law and was admitted to the Tennessee bar.

Mississippi 
He moved to Natchez, Mississippi, in 1871 and was elected the following year to be the city attorney and the city weigher. He was admitted to The Mississippi Bar in 1875.

In 1878 Bowles was appointed as a colonel of the militia. He was elected as the chief of police in 1879.

He was elected to represent Adams County in the Mississippi House of Representatives from 1881 to 1894. He was a Republican.
In 1888 he proposed that the office of Justice of the Peace be abolished as the city already had two magistrates and other staff with the jurisdiction to do the same task. Shortly after he proposed to repeal the Railroad Commission bill to save taxpayers money on the "useless" commission. He also authored a bill to establish a colored insane asylum.
In December 1891 the election for the position of representative for Adams County was contested by Charles R. Byrnes against Bowles. Byrnes withdrew his contest on December 28, 1891, leaving Bowles as the Representative for Adams.

In 1891 he was elected as the president of the Mississippi Colored State Bar Association, it was the first colored state bar in America.

January 1892 he had the honor of being appointed to the Judiciary Committee a position that no other "colored man" had been appointed to since the Democrats gained control.

He was called to run again in 1895 to serve Adams County in the legislature but declined due to new interests to do with his private business.

He served on the School Board and had been a city marshal. He also was a large grocery merchant.

He had been an organiser of the Universal Brotherhood and was a prominent member of the Knights of Pythias and the Knights of Honor. He had been a grand chancellor of the Mississippi Knights of Pythias.

Death 
He died December 26, 1899, at his home.
He lived at 13 St. Catherine, Natchez, as noted on a historic marker.
His wife, Laura E. (nee Davis), preceded him in death by a couple of months dying August 17, 1899.
He died with no close relatives, so his will dispersed his estate to local friends and organisations.

See also
African-American officeholders during and following the Reconstruction era

References

External links

Republican Party members of the Mississippi House of Representatives
People from Charleston, South Carolina
Mississippi lawyers
Politicians from Natchez, Mississippi
African-American lawyers
African-American police officers
American police chiefs
American militia officers
Union Army soldiers
1844 births
1899 deaths
School board members in Mississippi
City and town attorneys in the United States
African-American state legislators in Mississippi
19th-century American lawyers
African-American politicians during the Reconstruction Era
Free Negroes
Tennessee lawyers